Blues on Top of Blues is the fourteenth studio album by B.B. King, released in 1968 on BluesWay BLS-6011. The album reached a peak position of number 46 on Billboard R&B Albums chart.

Track listing

References

1968 albums
B.B. King albums
BluesWay Records albums
Albums arranged by Johnny Pate
Albums conducted by Johnny Pate
Albums produced by Johnny Pate